The 1932 United States presidential election in Alabama took place on November 8, 1932, as part of the nationwide presidential election. Alabama voters chose eleven representatives, or electors, to the Electoral College, who voted for president and vice president. In Alabama, voters voted for electors individually instead of as a slate, as in the other states.

Alabama was won by Governor Franklin D. Roosevelt (D–New York), running with Speaker John Nance Garner, with 84.74% of the popular vote, against incumbent President Herbert Hoover (R–California), running with Vice President Charles Curtis, with 14.13% of the popular vote. This is also the only time in history that any presidential candidate has won every single county in the state, notably due to Roosevelt carrying reliably-Unionist Winston County by a margin of just a single vote.

Results

Results by county

See also
United States presidential elections in Alabama

Notes

References

Alabama
1932
1932 Alabama elections